Ahmed Ramadan Abdou Mohamed (born 23 March 1997), nicknamed Beckham, is an Egyptian football player who is currently playing for Ceramica Cleopatra. He is product of Al Ahly youth academy.

Career statistics 
''Last updated on August 31, 2021

With clubs

Honours

Al Ahly
Egyptian Premier League: 2016–17, 2017–18
 FIFA Club World Cup: Third-Place 2020 FIFA Club World Cup
 CAF Champions League: 2020-21

Egypt
Africa U-23 Cup of Nations Champions: 2019

References

1997 births
Living people
Egyptian footballers
Association football wingers
Al Ahly SC players
Haras El Hodoud SC players
Wadi Degla SC players
Place of birth missing (living people)
Footballers at the 2020 Summer Olympics
Olympic footballers of Egypt
21st-century Egyptian people